1990 World Ice Hockey Championships may refer to:
1990 Men's World Ice Hockey Championships
1990 IIHF Women's World Championship